Sheriff Callie's Wild West is a Disney Junior television show and every episode has a song. The following is a list of songs.

Soundtrack
A soundtrack containing Sheriff Callie's Wild West songs was released as an iTunes album on December 23, 2014, and then later released on CD format on June 30, 2015, containing 26 songs from the series.

Season 1 songs

Season 2 songs

DJ Melodies
See Sheriff Callie's Wild West#DJ Melodies

References

Sheriff Callie's Wild West songs
Sheriff Callie's Wild West songs
Sheriff Callie's Wild West songs